The Order of Industrial Service Merit (Hangul: 산업훈장, Hanja: 産業勳章) is an order of merit of South Korea (the Republic of Korea). It is presented to individuals and businesses who have contributed to the development of industry and the national economy.

Grades
The Order of Industrial Service Merit is divided into five classes. The grades are as follows: 
 Gold Tower: 금 탑(金 塔)
 Silver Tower: 은 탑(銀 塔)
 Bronze Tower: 동 탑(銅 塔)
 Iron Tower: 철 탑(鐵 塔)
 Tin Tower: 석 탑(錫 塔)

Notable recipients
Cho Yang-ho
Chung Joon-Yang
Daou Technology Inc.
Hyun Jae-hyun
Hyundai Engineering (HEC)
Kang Duk-soo
Kim Dai-Sung
Kim Joong-up
Kim S. Joon
Kim Swoo-geun
Kim Chong-Hee
Carl Ferris Miller
Ssangyong Engineering and Construction

References

External links

Military awards and decorations of South Korea